The United States Air Force Band of Liberty was a United States military band of forty-five active duty members, based at Hanscom Air Force Base, Massachusetts. It entertains audiences in New England, New York, and New Jersey. The band was inactivated in summer 2013. Some of its personnel joined the U.S. Air Force Heritage of America Band, which took up some of its functions.

History
The band is a select group of professional Airmen-musicians who support the global Air Force mission by providing musical products and services for official military, recruiting, and community relations events, and by fostering America’s rich national heritage. Originally known as the 541st Air Force Band of the Southwest, stationed at Luke AFB, Arizona, the unit relocated to Pease AFB, New Hampshire in 1978. Renamed the Air Force Band of New England, the band brought its musical message of pride, patriotism, and professionalism to concerts and events throughout New England. In 1991, the band received its current name and was assigned to Electronics Systems Center, Hanscom Air Force Base, in Massachusetts.   This change fostered another new name: the United States Air Force Band of Liberty.

The Band of Liberty consists of forty-five active duty personnel assigned to two primary ensembles—the Concert Band and the Afterburner popular music group. The organization has several subgroups, including the Ceremonial/Marching Band, Liberty Big Band, Colonial Brass, New England Winds woodwind quintet, and the Bay State Winds clarinet quartet. The band performs around four hundred engagements a year, and has appeared at such venues as Lincoln Center in New York City and the Hatch Shell in Boston.  On January 20, 2009, the Band of Liberty's Colonial Brass provided musical support at the Farewell Ceremony of President George W. Bush. On January 3, 2007, members of the Ceremonial Band performed at Grace Episcopal Church in East Grand Rapids, Michigan for the state funeral of Gerald Ford, 38th President of the United States.

As part of larger restructuring of and cuts to military bands, the band was disbanded in mid-2013.

Mission statement

Support the Global Air Force Mission—by fostering our national heritage and providing professional musical products and services for official military, recruiting, and community relations events

Vision
World Class—Mission Ready Air Force Music Professionals
using the power of music to:
– Inspire our Air Force and the great nation we serve
– Produce innovative musical programs and products
– Communicate Air Force excellence

Performing Ensembles

Concert Band
The Ambassadors Big Band
Liberty Big Band
Afterburner pop music group
Ceremonial/Marching Band
Colonial Brass
New England Winds Woodwind Quintet
Bay State Winds Clarinet Quartet
Liberty Saxophone Quartet
Protocol Jazz Combos

Discography
 The New England Winds/The Colonial Brass—January 2008
 On Silver Wings—Celebrating the 60th Anniversary of the U.S. Air Force—July 2007 (Concert Band)
 Sampler—May 2007 (Afterburner)
 The Most Wonderful Time—November 2006 (Concert Band/Liberty Pops)
 Rock Rhythm & Blue—July 2005 (Afterburner)
 Ain't Nothin' Nu—December 2004 (Liberty Big Band née Ambassadors Jazz Ensemble)
 New England Holidays—December 2003 (various ensembles)
 Salute to the American Spirit—July 2003 (Concert Band)

Musician Education/Experience
 41% possessed Master's degrees
 45% possessed Bachelor's degrees
 The members of Afterburner had over 30 years combined professional music experience beyond their Air Force careers, and performed with Lee Ann Womack, Lee Greenwood, Ben Vereen, The Fabulous Thunderbirds, Rita Moreno, Phyllis Diller and Joel Grey.

Guest Artists and Collaborations

 The American Belles—singing/dancing trio
 Frank Battisti—Conductor Emeritus, New England Conservatory of Music
 Mike Brignola—jazz baritone saxophonist, Woody Herman and Jaco Pastorius big bands
 Ann Hampton Callaway—Broadway singer (Swing!)
 Charlie Daniels—country music artist
 Gregg Edelman—actor (Spider-Man 2) and Broadway singer (Camelot)
 Colonel (ret) Arnald D. Gabriel—Conductor Emeritus, United States Air Force Band
 Crystal Gayle—country singer
 Greg Hopkins—jazz trumpeter/composer/educator, Berklee College of Music
 Jack Jones- Jazz singer
 Darlene Love—actress (Lethal Weapon movies) and Broadway singer (Hairspray)
 Michael Maguire—Broadway singer (Les Misérables)
 Maureen McGovern—actress (Airplane! and  The Towering Inferno)  and Broadway singer (Little Women)
The Mills Brothers vocal group
 Bill Pierce—jazz tenor saxophonist/educator, Berklee College of Music
 John Pizzarelli—jazz guitarist, vocalist, songwriter and bandleader
 Helen Reddy-Australian-American singer
 Byron Stripling—trumpet virtuoso
 Jiggs Whigham—jazz trombonist/educator
 Phil Wilson—jazz trombonist/composer/educator, Berklee College of Music
 Sharon "Zee" Zeffiro—classical-crossover singing sensation

See also
 Hanscom Air Force Base
 United States military bands

References

External links 

 United States Air Force Band of Liberty Home

Wind bands
Military units and formations in Massachusetts
Bands of the United States Air Force
Military units and formations established in 1978
Military units and formations disestablished in 2013